Kostyonki (lit. "small bones"), also spelled Kostenki, is a rural locality (a selo) in Khokholsky District of Voronezh Oblast, Russia, located on western middle bank of the Don River.

It is known for its archaeological sites with a high concentration of cultural remains of anatomically modern humans from the beginning of the Upper Paleolithic era.

References

Notes

Rural localities in Khokholsky District